New York IRT, also known as IRT F.C., was an early 20th-century American soccer team sponsored by the Interborough Rapid Transit Company.

History
In 1916, the team entered the New York State Association Football League. In 1918, it went to the fourth round of the 1918 National Challenge Cup where it fell to Paterson F.C.   In 1919, New York IRT entered the National Association Football League, but withdrew after only five games.

Year-by-year

Honors
La Sultana Cup
 Winner (2): 1917, 1918

Southern New York Association Cup
 Winner (2): 1917, 1918

References

Defunct soccer clubs in New York City
IRT
National Association Football League teams
Works soccer clubs in the United States